is a former Japanese football player.

Club statistics

References

External links

1984 births
Living people
University of Teacher Education Fukuoka alumni
Association football people from Kumamoto Prefecture
Japanese footballers
J2 League players
Japan Football League players
Giravanz Kitakyushu players
Verspah Oita players
Association football forwards